Richard Bone (born February 3, 1952) is an American electronic musician.

Life and career
Born in Atlanta, Georgia, Bone began his professional musical career creating soundtracks and scores for several off-Broadway companies working in experimental theater. In 1979, he released with his band Bone the single "Pirate the Islands/Headlines Have It" before joining the new-wave band Shox Lumania in 1981. Bone then recorded a solo 7" entitled "Digital Days/Alien Girl" on and was subsequently signed to Survival Records in the UK where he released several LPs, EPs, singles and contributed to various compilation albums. His 1983 single "Joy of Radiation" reached No. 1 on the Hong Kong Dance Chart.

Bone started the label Quirkworks Laboratory Discs in 1991, allowing him freedom to create music of a more experimental nature and retain control of his musical direction. Since then Bone has released over 25 recordings of new material and several collaborations and compilations. Of the new material recordings, three quickly rose to No. 1 on industry charts as well as receiving numerous other honors. In 2004 Bone's recording The Reality Temples was nominated for the 2004 New Age Reporter Lifestyle Music Awards' Best Electronic Album, his 2005 recording Saiyuji was nominated for the 2005 New Age Reporter Lifestyle Music Awards' Best Ambient Album, his 2007 recording Infinite Plastic Creation was awarded the 2007 New Age Reporter Lifestyle Music Awards' Best Electronic Album and his 2008 release Sudden Departure was nominated for the 2008 New Age Reporter LifeStyle Awards’ Best Ambient and Best Electronic Album.

In 2019 Bone released Empyrean Castles and A Garden of Invited Flowers.

Discography

Solo albums
Empyrean Castles, 2019, Quirkworks Laboratory Discs
A Garden of Invited Flowers, 2019, Quirkworks Laboratory Discs
Nibiru - Drones from the 12th Planet, 2018, Quirkworks Laboratory Discs
Age of Falconry, 2017, Mega Dodo*AERA, 2016, USB Release, Quirkworks Laboratory Discs
Involution Vol. 1, 2015, Quirkworks Laboratory Discs
Vertical Life, 2014, Quirkworks Laboratory Discs
Cranium Fizz, 2013, Quirkworks Laboratory Discs
Anthology, 2013, AD Music UK
Images from A Parallel World, 2013, AD Music UK
Mind Environs, 2011 Quirkworks Laboratory Discs (soundtrack from the iTunes app)
XesseX - The Palindrome Project, 2011, Quirkworks Laboratory Discs
Adaptors, 2011, Prismatikone (Italy)
Beleaguered Blossoms, 2010, Quirkworks Laboratory Discs
The Ghosts of Hanton Village, 2009, Quirkworks Laboratory Discs
Sudden Departure, 2008, Quirkworks Laboratory Discs
Short Waves, 2008, Quirkworks Laboratory Discs
Emerging Melodies (CD Re-Issue), 2008, Quirkworks Laboratory Discs
Connection Failed, 2008, Quirkworks Laboratory Discs
Songs From The Analog Attic, 2007, Quirkworks Laboratory Discs
Infinite Plastic Creation, 2007, Quirkworks Laboratory Discs
Experiments '80-'82, 2007, Quirkworks Laboratory Discs
Serene Life of Microbes, 2006, AD Music UK
Vesperia, 2006, Quirkworks Laboratory Discs
Saiyuji, 2005, Quirkworks Laboratory Discs
The Reality Temples, 2004, Spiralight Recordings
Untold Tales, 2004, Orlandomaniac Music (Sweden)
Alternate Realities, 2003, Spiralight Recordings
Indium, 2002, Electroshock (Russia)
Disorient, 2002, Quirkworks Laboratory Discs
Alternate Worlds vol. 1 (MP3 Release), 2001, Quirkworks Laboratory Discs
Tales from the Incantina, 2001, Indium/Quirkworks Laboratory Discs
Ascensionism, 2000, Quirkworks Laboratory Discs
Distillation, 1999, Halcyon
Ether Dome, 1999, Hypnos Recordings
Coxa, 1999, Quirkworks Laboratory Discs
The Spectral Ships, 1998, Hypnos Recordings
Electropica, 1998, Quirkworks Laboratory Discs
A Survey of Remembered Things, 1997, (a shared disc with John Orsi) Quirkworks Laboratory Discs
Metaphysic Mambo, 1996, Reversing
The Eternal Now, 1996, Quirkworks Laboratory Discs
Vox Orbita, 1995, Quirkworks Laboratory Discs
Ambiento, 1994, Quirkworks Laboratory Discs
X Considers Y, 1994, Quirkworks Laboratory Discs
Quirkwork, 1993, Quirkworks Laboratory Discs

Vinyl releases
Obtuse Tantrums (7” vinyl), 2015, AttractiveCO
Brave Sketches' (2x 12” vinyl), 2015, Orlandomaniac MusicVaulted Vsions (3x 12” vinyl), 2014, Vinyl on DemandX Considers Y (12” vinyl), 1994, Quirkworks Laboratory DiscsExspectacle (12” vinyl), 1985, SurvivalThe Real Swing (12” vinyl), 1984, SurvivalLiving in Partytown (12” vinyl), 1984, SurvivalJoy of Radiation (12” vinyl), 1983, SurvivalEmerging Melodies (12” vinyl), 1983, RumbleBrave Tales (12” vinyl), 1983, SurvivalThe Beat is Elite (12” vinyl), 1982, SurvivalJoy/Do Angels Dance (7” vinyl), 1983, SurvivalDigital Days/Alien Girl (7” vinyl), 1981, Rumble/SurvivalLife in Video City (cassette), 1980, EurockQuiz Party (cassette), 1980, EurockPirate the Islands/Headlines (7” vinyl), 1979, Rumble

CollaborationsVia Poetica, 2007, (with Lisa Indish) Quirkworks Laboratory DiscsSongs from Early Paradise (with Mary Zema), 1998, Quirkworks Laboratory DiscsRubber Rodeo (with Rubber Rodeo), 1982, Eat RecordsShe Had To Go (with Rubber Rodeo), 1982, Eat RecordsLive at the Peppermint Lounge (with Shox Lumania), 1981, ROIR(I Have) No Shoes/Signals (with Shox Lumania), 1981, RumbleJolene/ Who’s on Top? (with Rubber Rodeo), 1981, RumbleAge of Urban Heroes (with Urban Heroes), 1981, Dutch AriolaHeadlines'' (with Urban Heroes), 1980, Dutch Ariola

Compilation tracks
"Adrift" from Sounds from the Circle, 2012, NewAge Music Circle
"Do You Hear What I Hear?" from Christmas AD, 2011, AD Music
"The Seduction of Dr. Pasteur" from Night Music, 2010, AD Music
"Mambopolis" from Disco For Abruzzo, 2009, Wondersounds
"Son of Icarus" from Euphony 2, 2009, wwuh.org
"Mutant Wisdom" from Cosmic Disco? Cosmic Rock!, 2008, Eskimo
"The Memory of Caves" from Euphony 1, 2008, wwuh.org
"Mambopolis" from Discotech, 2007, Electunes
"Autotrophic Light" from Schwingunen #138, 2006, Cue-Records
"Stillness Repeating" from Ambienism, 2004, Spiralight Recordings
"Dzibana" from Harmony with Ambience, 2003, Windfarm Records
"Spires" from Logan’s Run, 2002, Discos Veveos
"Elusia, I Can See!" from Electroacoustic Music V. 3, 1999, Electroshock
"Murmurio" from Oscillations, 1998, Halcyon
"Via Mycropia" from The Other World, 1998, Hypnos Recordings
"Vox 2.5" from EM:T 1197, 1997, EM:T
"untitled" from The Answering Machine Solution, 1996, Staalplaat
"In the Shadow of Rain" from Back to the Universe, 1996, Only Records
"The Demon Angel", “Mi Mundo”, “Amb 7.4.53”, Amb 4.6.47”, “Anastasia Says” & “The Deluxe Set” from Media Works, 1995, Grace Pro
"Etherea Arriving" from Maine Vocals, 1995, Reversing
"Overstated Papers" from ANON, 1995, Von Buhler
"Vox 9” & “Illicit Behavior" from Indiegestion Samplers # 7, 1995, Alternative Press
"X Considers Y” & El Gato Negro" from Indiegestion Samplers # 5, 1995, Alternative Press
"The Real Swing" from Pulse 8, 1985, Survival
"Far from Yesterday" from Film Noir – American Style, 1984, Ding Dong
"Living in Partytown" from The Art of Survival, 1984, Survival
"Joy of Radiation" from Dance Report, 1983, Survival
"Monster Movie” & “Quantum Hop" from Mind & Matter / Megamix, 1983, Survival
"Alternative Music for the  Lounge" from The American Music Compilation, 1982, Eurock

See also 
List of ambient music artists

References

External links 
Richard Bone Official home page

1952 births
Living people
American electronic musicians
Ambient musicians
American experimental musicians
Musicians from Atlanta